Abigail Child is a filmmaker, poet, and writer who has been active in experimental writing and media since the 1970s.  She has completed more than thirty film and video works and installations, and six books. Child's early film work addressed the interplay between sound and image through reshaping narrative tropes, prefiguring many concerns of contemporary film and media.

Academics
In 1968, Abigail Child graduated from Radcliffe College in Harvard University with a degree in history and literature. She has received a Guggenheim Fellowship in Film. She has taught at several universities, including New York University, Massachusetts College of Art, and Hampshire College. She has been the chair of Film and Animation department at the School of the Museum of Fine Arts, Boston since 2000 and was appointed to a fellowship at the Radcliffe Institute for Advanced Study.  In 2009, she was awarded the Rome Prize.

Career in film, writing, and poetry 
Child began making films in the 1970s, producing seven independent documentaries shot on 16mm. From the middle of the 70s she turned to experimental montage and in the 80s her work explores gender and strategies for remaking narrative. Is This What You Were Born For? is a major, seven-part experimental work from this period, completed over nine years, which included the cult classics Mayhem and Covert Action. In the 90s, Child poetically envisioned and interrogated public spaces in such films as B/side (1996), about urban homelessness on the Lower East Side of New York city,  and Below the New: A Russian Chronicle (1999), filmed in St. Petersburg.

In the 21st century, Child's film and video has explored history, memory, and cultural experiences—the politics of place and identity.  Digital works like Cake + Steak (2004) and The Future Is Behind You (2005) investigate the awkward drama of the everyday, often utilizing found material to examine the past. Mirror World (2006) is a multi-screen installation that incorporates parts of Child's “foreign film” series to explore narrative excess.  Key works include Surface Noise (2000), Dark Dark (2001), Where The Girls Are (2002), Cake and Steak (2004), The Future Is Behind You (2004), To and No Fro (2005), and Mirror World (2006). Her feature video documentary On The Downlow (2007)), is an exploration of bisexuality and an intimate look at a little-viewed underground scene.

In 2012, Child completed a feature film, Shape of Error, an imaginary “home movie”  based on the diaries of Mary Shelley during her marriage with Percy Shelley.

Child is also the author of five books of poetry (published between 1983 and 2012)  and a book of critical writings: This Is Called Moving: A Critical Poetics of Film (2005).

A collection of writings by various authors on Is This What You Were Born For?, including a DVD of the film series, was published in 2011.

Filmography
 Acts and Intermissions	(2017)
 Salome	(2014)
 ELSA 	(2012)
 Unbound	(2012)
 A Shape Of Error	(2011)	feature film on Mary and Percy Shelley	
 The Suburban Trilogy	(2011)	film and digital
 Riding the Tiger: Letters from Capitalist China	(2010-2014)	
 Hacking Empire	(2010)	single screen version of L'Impero Invertito	
 If I Can Sing A Song About Ligatures 	(2009)	w/ Nada Gordon, Foreign Film Series	
  Surf And Turf	(2008-2011)	16mm/digital, The Suburban Trilogy, part 3	
 On The Downlow	(2007) Digital feature documentary, dir. by Child; ed: Yael Bitton; Camera: Arthur Jafa
 Mirror World	(2006)	16mm to digital, w/ Gary Sullivan Foreign Film Series
 To And No Fro	(2005)	16mm to digital, w/ Monica de la Torre. Foreign Film Series	
 Blonde Fur	(2004) Loop from Cake and Steak	
 The Party	(2004)	
 The Future Is Behind You 	(2004)	film/digital, The Suburban Trilogy, Part 2	
 Cake and Steak	(2003–04)	film/digital, The Suburban Trilogy, Part 1
 The Milky Way	(2003)	Installation version of Dark Dark
 Subtalk	(2002)	digital, w/ Benton C Bainbridge and Eric Rosenzveig 	
 Dark Dark	(2001)	film, How the World Works, Part 2
 Surface Noise	(2000)	film, How the World Works, Part 1 	
 Below the New	(1999)	
 Her Thirteenth Year (screenplay)	(1998)	
 B/Side	(1996)	
 Dinkinsville 	(1994)	
 Through The Looking Lass w/ L. Champagne & Songs	(1993)	interactive video performance	
 Songs 	(1993)	interactive video performance w/Benton C Bainbridge, Vicky Funari and Ikue Mori	
 8 Million 	(1992)	video album w/ Ikue Mori)	
 Swamp 	(1990–91)	w/ S. Schulman	
 Mercy 	(1989)	Is This What You Were Born For? Part 7 	
 Both 	(1988)	Is This What You Were Born For? Part 3	
 Mayhem 	(1987)	Is This What You Were Born For? Part 6	
 Perils	(1985–86) Is This What You Were Born For? Part 5	
 Covert Action	(1984)	Is This What You Were Born For? Part 4	
 Mutiny	(1982–83) Is This What You Were Born For? Part 2	
 Prefaces	(1981) Is This What You Were Born For? Part 1	
 Ornamentals	(1979)		
 Pacific Far East Line (1979)		
 Peripeteia II	(1978)		
 Daylight Test Section	(1978)		
 Peripeteia I	(1977)		
 Some Exterior Presence	(1977)		
 Tar Garden	(1975)		
 Mother Movie	 (1973)		
 Game	(1972)	w/Jon Child	
 Except The People	(1970)	w/Jon Child

Publications
 Is this what you were born for? (MetisPresses, 2011)
 This is Called Moving: A Critical Poetics of Film (University of Alabama Press, 2005)
 Counter Clock (Tout Court Editions, Mermaid Tenement Press, 2009)
 Artificial Memory (Belladonna Press, 2001)
 Flesh poems for Sarah Shulman by Abigail Child (Published by ZET Amsterdam - New York 1990)
 Scatter Matrix (Roof Books, 1996)
 Mob (O Books, 1994)
 A Motive for Mayhem (Potes & Poets, 1989)
 Climate Plus (Coincidence Press: Second Season, 1986)
 From Solids (Roof Books, 1983)

References

External links
 Official website
 
 
 Biography at School of the Museum of Fine Arts, Boston

American filmmakers
American animated film directors
American women writers
Harvard Fellows
Radcliffe College alumni
Massachusetts College of Art and Design faculty
New York University faculty
Museum of Fine Arts, Boston
Yale School of Art alumni
1948 births
Living people
American women animators
Lambda Literary Award winners
American women academics
21st-century American women